Abdelhadi Tazi (June 15, 1921 – April 2, 2015) was a scholar, writer, historian and former Moroccan ambassador in various countries.

Early life
Tazi was born in Fes, Morocco, and attended primary and secondary studies in his hometown. Since his youth, he has contributed to the anti-colonial Nationalist Movement and thus experienced exile and prison.

Biography
 1947: Obtained the High degree Diploma in Theological studies from the University of Al Karaouine with "Honores".
 1948: Teacher in the same university.
 1953: Graduated from Moroccan Institute of High Studies.
 1957: After Independence, he was appointed at Rabat, as Director of the Cultural Section in the Ministry of national Education.
 1963: Obtained the Diploma of High Studies in History from the Mohammed V University with distinction "Excellent".
 1966: English certificate from the language Institute of Baghdad.
 1971: Obtained a PhD in History from the University of Alexandria with "Honores".

Since his youth (1935) he has published numerous articles and essays (more than 600) and translated many works and studies from English and French into Arabic.

1963/1967: Ambassador of the Kingdom of Morocco in Iraq republic
1967/1968: Ambassador of the Kingdom of Morocco in Libya 
1968/1972: Back to Baghdad as an ambassador, he also achieved diplomatic missions within the Persian Gulf
1973: Director of the Institute for Scientific Research.	 
1979: Ambassador in the Islamic Republic of Iran, then in charge of mission at the Royal Cabinet of the Kingdom of Morocco.	
1990: Chairman and Founder of the Moroccan Diplomatic Club.	 
1992: Chairman of the sixth International Conference of Geographical Names Standardization.	 

one of his important work is the travels of Ibn battuta 
Rihla (  -  simply referred to as The Rihla الرحلة or "The Journey") is a medieval book which recounts the journey of the 14th-century Moroccan scholar and traveler Ibn Battuta.
	
Professor and lecturer in several Institutes, High Schools and Universities in Morocco and around the world about international relations, civilization and history.
	
Has participated to many conferences and congress (cultural, social and political), including summit conferences.

Member 

 Irakian Scientific Academy since 1966,
 Arabic Language Academy in Cairo 1976,
 Arab-Argentina Institute 1978,
 Ahl Albayt Academy and of the Arabic Language Academy of Jordan 1980,
 Constitution Committee of the Kingdom of Morocco Academy and member of this Academy since 1980,
 Arabic Language Academy of Damas since 1986
 Institute of the Islamic Heritage, London since 1991,
Egyptian Science Academy, 1996
and of many other regional and international associations

Decorations 

• Throne Wissam (Morocco 1963).
• El Hamala Al Kobra (Libya 1968).
• Wissam Arrafidaine (Irak 1972).
• The Intellectual first Class Merit Medal (Morocco 1976)
• The Gold Medal of the Academy of the Kingdom of Morocco (1992).

List of works 

	Here there are some of the author's works:
Sourate Annour, explanation	
Literature of "Lamyat al Arab"		
11 centuries History of the Qaraouiyn (in 3 languages): Fes Weddings		
Annotation of the Ibn Sahib Assalat's book on the Almohades		
A glimpse on diplomatic history of Morocco	
 Moroccan-American relations history (in English)	
Translation of "If I see three days" from Helen Keller	
Al Qaraouiyn University History (3 volumes)		
Libya, through the Journey of Ishaqui 		
The "Badia Palace", world wonder		
In the shadow of faith	
Sicilia after Ambassador Ibn Othman memories	
Education in Arab countries (in 3 languages)	
Official Moroccan Letters - first part		
	Moroccan-Iranian relations		
	
Falcon Hunting between the Machrek and the Maghreb	
French protectora : beginning and end	
	Moroccan 'Waqfs' in Jerusalem		
	Annotations of the manuscript of Ibn Abo Al Ojals on Jews in Yemen		
	History of the relations between Morocco and Oman		
	In order to defend the territorial integrity (a trip with Prince Sidi Mohamed in his first political mission in Africa)		
	Secret codes in Moroccan correspondences		
	Annotations of the manuscript 'Al Farid' of Abi Al Kassim Al Figuigui (Sata Chasu au Fourcens)		
	
Iran between yesterday and today		
	Summary of the history of Moroccan international relations (3 languages)		
	
Al Maghraoui and his pedagogic thinkings		
	Moroccan diplomatic history (12 volumes)		
	
Moroccan diplomatic history as a comic 		
	Women through the west Muslim history		
	Annotations of the manuscript "Al Mazaa al latif" d'Ibn Zaydan		
	Ibnou Majid and Portugal		
	Annotations of "Ibn Batouta Journey" (5 volumes)		
	Jerusalem and Hebron according to Moroccan travellers		
	
Taha Hussein in Morocco		
	Annotation of the transcript 'Attorthorth' of Choyouti		
	The Prophet's medicine between the Machriek and the Maghreb		
	Moroccan International History (3 volumes)

Coming soon 
 A journey to Hijaz
 Moroccan Diplomatic History (3 volumes)
 Annotations of a manuscript about the Moroccan movement for slavery abolition in Morocco
Annotation of the manuscript concerning the journey of Ibn Othman to Malta and Napoli
 Summarised geographical lexique of Morocco
 Personal memories, started June 15, 2000

Death
Tazi died in Rabat, Morocco, aged 94.

References

 https://web.archive.org/web/20080820025337/http://www.abdelhaditazi.com/

External links 
 Education in the Arab states (1977) 
 Coexistence between democracy and Islamic Shoura developed through time (2004) 
  Interview with Abdelhadi Tazi by Le Matin (2005) 

1921 births
2015 deaths
Moroccan writers
Moroccan essayists
Moroccan male writers
Male essayists
20th-century Moroccan historians
People from Fez, Morocco
Alexandria University alumni
Ambassadors of Morocco
Ambassadors of Morocco to Libya
Ambassadors of Morocco to Iran
Ambassadors of Morocco to Iraq
University of al-Qarawiyyin alumni
Academic staff of the University of al-Qarawiyyin
Mohammed V University alumni
Advisors to Hassan II of Morocco
21st-century Moroccan historians
Member of the Academy of the Kingdom of Morocco
Members of Academy of the Arabic Language in Cairo